Group A was one of two groups of the 2015 IIHF World Championship. The four best placed teams advanced to the playoff round, while the last placed team was relegated to Division I in 2016.

Standings

All times are local (UTC+2).

1 May

Canada vs Latvia

Czech Republic vs Sweden

2 May

Switzerland vs Austria

France vs Germany

Latvia vs Czech Republic

3 May

Austria vs Sweden

Canada vs Germany

France vs Switzerland

4 May

Latvia vs Sweden

Canada vs Czech Republic

5 May

Switzerland vs Germany

Austria vs France

6 May

Switzerland vs Latvia

Sweden vs Canada

7 May

Czech Republic vs France

Sweden vs Germany

8 May

Czech Republic vs Austria

Germany vs Latvia

9 May

France vs Canada

Austria vs Latvia

Sweden vs Switzerland

10 May

Germany vs Czech Republic

Switzerland vs Canada

11 May

Germany vs Austria

Sweden vs France

12 May

Canada vs Austria

Latvia vs France

Czech Republic vs Switzerland

References

External links
Official website

A